George Merrill may refer to:

 George Merrill (Medal of Honor) (1847–1925), American Civil War soldier
 George Merrill (life partner of Edward Carpenter) (1867–1928), lifelong companion of English poet and gay activist Edward Carpenter
 George Merrill (songwriter) (born 1956), American songwriter
 George Sargent Merrill (1837–1900), U.S. Commander-in-Chief of the Grand Army of the Republic
 George W. Merrill (1837–1914), American politician and diplomat
 George Edmands Merrill (1846–1908), American Baptist clergyman and educator
 George F. Merrill (1847–1941), former member of the Wisconsin Legislature
 George Perkins Merrill (1854–1929), American geologist
 George Knox Merrill (1864–1927), American lichenologist